Francisco Nahuel Tetaz Chaparro (born 11 June 1989, in Argentina) is an Argentina international rugby union player and currently he plays for the Italian Pro14 team Benetton.

A prop forward, he began his career with Bigua Rugby Club (Mar del Plata) and La Plata. From 2011 to 2013 he joined with Stade Français. In 2013 Tetaz Chaparro signed with Newport Gwent Dragons for the 2013–14 season and Lyon Olympique for the 2014–15 season. He was released by the Dragons in April 2014.

In 2009 he was named in the Argentina Under 20 squad and from 2009 to 2014 in the Argentina Jaguars. Member of Pumas from 2010, Chaparro was a starter for the  national team on 14 November 2020 in their first ever win against the All Blacks. Chaparro was named in Argentina's squad for the 2015 Rugby World Cup but then had to withdraw through injury and was replaced by Juan Figallo.

References

External links

IRB profile

Argentine rugby union players
Argentina international rugby union players
Dragons RFC players
Stade Français players
Pampas XV players
La Plata Rugby Club players
Jaguares (Super Rugby) players
Living people
1989 births
Rugby union props
Argentine expatriate rugby union players
Expatriate rugby union players in France
Expatriate rugby union players in Wales
Argentine expatriate sportspeople in Wales
Argentine expatriate sportspeople in France
Lyon OU players
Bristol Bears players
Benetton Rugby players
Sportspeople from Buenos Aires Province